Still Life is the debut novel written by Louise Penny and published by St. Martin's Paperbacks (an imprint of Macmillan Publishers, owned by Holtzbrinck Publishing Group) on 1 January 2005, which later went on to win the Anthony Award for Best First Novel in 2007. The story was adapted into a film called Still Life: A Three Pines Mystery in 2013.

Plot
A body is found in the woods near a small town called Three Pines. Inspector Gamache and his homicide team are sent to investigate.

References 

2005 Canadian novels
2005 debut novels
Canadian novels adapted into films
Novels by Louise Penny
Anthony Award-winning works